Gos is a -long river of Baden-Württemberg, Germany.  It is a tributary of the Fils near Bad Ditzenbach.

See also
List of rivers of Baden-Württemberg

Rivers of Baden-Württemberg
Rivers of Germany